The 2021 Reinert Open was a professional women's tennis tournament played on outdoor clay courts. It was the thirteenth edition of the tournament which was part of the 2021 ITF Women's World Tennis Tour. It took place in Versmold, Germany between 26 July and 1 August 2021.

Singles main-draw entrants

Seeds

 1 Rankings are as of 19 July 2021.

Other entrants
The following players received wildcards into the singles main draw:
  Noma Noha Akugue
  Nicole Rivkin
  Nastasja Schunk
  Joëlle Steur

The following players received entry using protected rankings:
  Jaimee Fourlis
  Katharina Hobgarski
  Anna Zaja

The following players received entry from the qualifying draw:
  Federica Arcidiacono
  Kamilla Bartone
  Jéssica Bouzas Maneiro
  Cristiana Ferrando
  Elizabeth Halbauer
  Arianne Hartono
  Anna Klasen
  Ekaterina Makarova

The following player received entry as a lucky loser:
  Elina Avanesyan

Champions

Singles

 Elina Avanesyan def.  Federica Di Sarra, 6–7(4–7), 6–2, 6–2

Doubles

   Anna Danilina /  Valeriya Strakhova def.  Mirjam Björklund /  Jaimee Fourlis, 4–6, 7–5, [10–4]

References

External links
 2021 Reinert Open at ITFtennis.com
 Official website

2021 ITF Women's World Tennis Tour
2021 in German tennis
July 2021 sports events in Germany
August 2021 sports events in Germany